Ralph Kirk James (21 May 1906 – 31 March 1994) was a Captain in the United States Navy during World War II. He retired in June 1963 as Rear Admiral.

James graduated from the Naval Academy in 1928. In 1933 he graduated from the Massachusetts Institute of Technology . He served in the Navy housing constructors, then the Puget Sound Naval Shipyard, the destroyer tender  in the composition of the Pacific Fleet and the Bureau of Ships. In 1942 he became a member of a diplomatic mission of Admiral William Glassford authorities of French West Africa, also accompanied him on the Casablanca Conference. In 1943 he took part in the hostilities on the Pacific Ocean, first as an officer responsible for coordinating repair units in the waters of the southern Pacific with headquarters at Espiritu Santo, then as commander of Service Squadron 10 on the island of Manus.

After the end of the war he worked as a controller in the Bureau of Ships and commander of the Long Beach Naval Shipyard. In 1956 he promoted to Admiral (Rear Admiral). In April 1959, he was head of the Bureau of Ships and served until retirement in June 1963. He remained active Retired engineer, attended among others in the drafting of the first American hovercraft. James died in 1994 of pneumonia.

Awards
Navy Distinguished Service Medal in August 1963 as Rear Admiral
Legion of Merit in September 1948 as Captain
Bronze Star Medal

References

1906 births
1994 deaths
United States Navy rear admirals (lower half)
United States Naval Academy alumni
Massachusetts Institute of Technology alumni
United States Navy personnel of World War II
Recipients of the Legion of Merit
Recipients of the Navy Distinguished Service Medal